Rainbow Lake is a town in northwest Alberta, Canada. It is west of High Level at the end of Highway 58, in Mackenzie County.

The town carries the name of the nearby lake, formed on the Hay River, that was so called due to its curved shape.

Demographics 

Infrastructure 
The community is served by the Rainbow Lake Airport , and is connected via Alberta Highway 58.

Education 
The town is home to the Rainbow Lake School operated by the Fort Vermilion School Division, which offers curriculum for kindergarten through grade 12.

See also 
List of communities in Alberta
List of towns in Alberta

References 

Statcan page for Rainbow Lake
Discover the Peace Country. Rainbow Lake
Rainbow Lake Provincial Recreation Area

External links 

1966 establishments in Alberta
Towns in Alberta
Former new towns in Alberta